Events in the year 2017 in Panama.

Incumbents
President: Juan Carlos Varela 
Vice President: Isabel Saint Malo

Legislative 
 President of the National Assembly:  Rubén de León

Events

13 to 22 January – The 2017 Copa Centroamericana was hosted in Panama.

Deaths

13 February – Ricardo Arias Calderón, politician, former Vice President (born 1933).

15 April – Amílcar Henríquez, footballer (b. 1983).

29 May – Manuel Noriega, dictator and military official, military ruler (b. 1934).

References

 
2010s in Panama
Years of the 21st century in Panama
Panama
Panama